This was the first edition of the tournament on the 2015 ITF Women's Circuit.

Raluca Olaru and Xu Yifan won the inaugural title, defeating An-Sophie Mestach and Demi Schuurs in the final, 6–3, 6–4.

Seeds

Draw

References 
 Draw

Aegon Ilkley Trophy - Doubles
2015 Women's Doubles